The 2017 Phillips 66 National Swimming Championships were held from June 27 to July 1, 2017, at the IU Natatorium in Indianapolis, Indiana.

Men's events

Women's events

References

External links
 Omega Timing Results

United States Swimming National Championships
Usa Swimming Championships, 2017
Swimming
2017 in sports in Indiana
Swimming competitions in Indiana